Natalija Golob is a Slovenian football striker, currently playing for ŽNK Slovenj Gradec in the Slovenian League. She was the championship's top scorer in 2008.

She is a member of the Slovenian national team since 2007.

References

External links
 

1986 births
Living people
Slovenian women's footballers
Slovenia women's international footballers
Women's association football forwards